Garhi Harsaru is a town and railway station in Gurugram district of Haryana state in India. It lies on the road from Gurugram city to Pataudi town. Its postal code (PIN) is 122505. According to the Census India 2011, it has a population of about 7894 persons of which 4216 are males while 3678 are females living in around 1539 households.

History

Garhi is the Hindi word for fortress. Garhi Harsaru is named after Ruler Harsh Dev Singh, one of the 21 sons of Raja Sangat Singh Chauhan ( Ruler of Mandhan near Alwar) who set himself up here in 1360 Vikram Samvat.
Raja Sangat was the great-grandson of Chahir Deo, brother of famous King Prithviraj Chauhan (See Page 64 of this reference). The area under the control of Garhi Harsaru, consisting of 60 villages, was called Dhundhoti.The descendants of the eldest son of Harsh Dev reside in the present day village Harsaru.

Growth

After conversion of the railway track from metre gauge to  broad gauge the railway junction has gained considerable importance. A large inland container depot has been set up near Garhi Harsaru Junction railway station and serves as a hub for transshipment of containers from and to Bombay port and seaports on the west coast of India in Gujarat. Private ports of Gujarat and large transporters have also constructed container depots here.

See also 
 Dhorka
 List of Gurjar clans
 Gurgaon
 Jhajjar
 Farrukhnagar
 Haryana
 Indian Railways
 Delhi Sarai Rohilla Railway Station
 Delhi Junction Railway station
 Rewari railway junction

References

Cities and towns in Gurgaon district